VOA most commonly refers to Voice of America, a U.S. government-funded state owned multimedia agency.

VOA may also refer to:

Government 
 Valuation Office Agency, an agency of the UK's HM Revenue and Customs
 Military Intelligence Agency, Serbia's military intelligence agency

Music 
 Visions of Atlantis, a symphonic power metal band from Austria
 VOA (album), a 1984 album and song by Sammy Hagar
 Voice of Asia, an annual music festival
 "Voa, Voa" ("Fly, Fly"), a song by Zé Ramalho from his 1978 album Zé Ramalho

Organisations 
 Viaggio Air (ICAO: VOA), a Bulgarian airline
 Volunteers of America, a nonprofit human services organization
 Vasa Order of America, a Swedish-American fraternal society

Other 
 Verb–object–agent, a theoretical variant of verb–object–subject; a language-classification type
 Vertex operator algebra, an algebraic structure used in conformal field theory
 Visa on Arrival, a type of travel visa
 The Voice of Action, a 1942 Canadian documentary
 Voice of Africa (disambiguation), multiple media outlets